Kenneth Frank Eichner (born July 29, 1954) is an American trial lawyer based in Denver, Colorado. Before rising to prominence as a defense attorney Eichner was a prosecutor in Prince George's County, Maryland. Eichner represented Timothy Gaudette during the Congressional inquiry of Supreme Court Justice nominee Brett Kavanaugh and the subsequent interview process by the Federal Bureau of Investigation. Eichner also represented presidential candidate  Hillary Clinton's server company, Platte River Networks, in the Federal Bureau of Investigation and Department of Justice National Security Division's inquiry into the handling of classified information.

Eichner is the author of the critically acclaimed suspense-thriller, D.A. Diaries, which chronicles a murder trial set in Washington, D.C. He is the associate producer of the Academy Award-nominated documentary, Fine Food, Fine Pastries, Open 6 to 9. Eichner has been listed as a Super Lawyer for more than a decade and named one of 5280's top criminal lawyers.

Early life and education
Eichner was born to a family of Jewish descent and grew up in the suburbs of Washington, D.C. His maternal grandfather, Daniel Feuerstein, fled Russia in 1917 during the Russian Revolution and immigrated to America. In 1921, after arriving in New York City, he founded the first dry goods union in the country. Eichner's grandfather later opened a grocery store in the U. Street district of Washington, D.C. Eichner's father, Sidney Eichner came of age during the Great Depression and sold encyclopedias door-to-door before eventually opening up a furniture store and serving in the Army Air Corps until 1945.

As a child, Eichner was a basketball enthusiast and attended Morgan Wooten's basketball academy at St. John's, where his coach was James Brown, now an announcer for CBS. Eichner attended Bethesda-Chevy Chase High School, then studied English at the University of Wisconsin-Madison. He completed his undergraduate degree at North Carolina State University in art history and design and went on to study at Antioch School of Law where he was editor of the Law Review. During law school he free-lanced as a journalist and wrote for several local papers, including one publication in The Washington Post, as well as served as an editor for "Trial Handbook for Lawyers." Eichner interned with the D.C. Court of Appeals for Judge James A. Belson. During law school Eichner was awarded a Department of Justice scholarship and clerked in the homicide division of the U.S. Attorney's Office. Upon graduation Eichner clerked for William C. McCullough, chief district court judge of Prince George's County, Maryland.

Career
As a prosecutor, Eichner successfully prosecuted Warren E. Graham, a 17-year-old boy that shot a high school teacher in a trial that drew the attention of Bill Clinton on the issue of school violence. Eichner was the recipient of the Maryland Governor's Citation, Senate and House of Delegates Resolutions for Outstanding Achievement as a Prosecutor.

In 1996 Eichner launched The Eichner Law Firm, based in Denver, Colorado. As a defense attorney, Eichner defended Carol Elkins, a nurse charged with murder. Though she faced life in prison, Elkins was eventually sentenced to house arrest. Other notable defenses include infamous serial killer Scott Lee Kimball, and Don Dewitt Smith, who was cleared of a vicious assault. After a six-year Department of Justice investigation into insurance fraud, Eichner won a six-week federal jury trial on behalf of Daniel John Travers, who was falsely accused of mail fraud. Eichner has tried a number of high-profile cases and has not lost a federal jury trial since 1998. In that year, Eichner won a federal trial in which Jon Williams was accused of playing a bomb making role in a national drug conspiracy network. Williams was acquitted of all charges and all the other co-defendants were sentenced to life. In 2016 Eichner represented Canadian citizen Colby Messer who was charged with six counts of sexual assault in Denver, Colorado. Mr. Messer and three other Canadians faced life imprisonment, and the entire case was dismissed after a two-day preliminary hearing, which was covered by NBC and every major media outlet in Canada. Eichner, along with Michael Delcour, also represented presidential candidate Hillary Clinton's technology service provider in connection with federal and congressional investigations in Colorado and Washington, D.C. In 2017, Eichner's successes with the Messer and Clinton cases led to his nomination for the Denver Bar Association's Award of Merit, which recognizes attorneys for outstanding contributions and services rendered in the administration of justice. During the 2018 Congressional Hearing of Supreme Court Justice nominee Brett Kavanaugh and subsequent FBI inquiry, Eichner represented witness Timothy Gaudette (referred to as “Timmy” on Justice Kavanaugh's calendar exhibit). In 2019, Eichner was awarded the largest verdict in Colorado history for defamation and malicious prosecution: $2.7 million in Weld County, Colorado.

Authorship
As well as his work while studying law, Eichner has lent his experience as a lawyer and skills as a writer of both fiction and nonfiction to various publications. He had an article appear in the Huffington Post regarding the Carol Chambers scandal in Arapahoe County, Colorado. Additionally, he has published a novel entitled D.A. Diaries about a federal murder trial. Eichner has worked in film production, notably as an associate producer for the Academy Award-nominated best documentary short film Fine Food, Fine Pastries, Open 6 to 9.

Personal life
Ken and his second wife, Janjuree, have a daughter, Kinaree Rose Eichner.

References

Living people
Antioch University alumni
Colorado lawyers
North Carolina State University alumni
People from Washington, D.C.
American crime fiction writers
1954 births